The 2015 Townsville Blackhawks season was the first in the club's history. Coached by Kristian Woolf and captained by Daniel Beasley, they competed in the Intrust Super Cup. The club won the minor premiership before losing in the grand final 20-32 to the Ipswich Jets.

Season summary
The Blackhawks played their first Intrust Super Cup game against the Mackay Cutters in Townsville, winning 30-16. They received their first loss the following week, losing 24-36 to the Ipswich Jets. The club then went on an 8-game winning streak before losing to the PNG Hunters at home. The Blackhawks finished the regular season as the minor premiers, winning 19 games. They qualified for the grand final, losing to the Ipswich Jets.

Milestones
 Round 1: The club played their first Intrust Super Cup game.
 Round 1: The club recorded their first Intrust Super Cup win.
 Round 1: Jahrome Hughes scored the club's first try.
 Round 2: The club recorded their first Intrust Super Cup loss.
 Round 4: Rhyse Martin became the first Blackhawks' player to score 4 tries in a game.
 Round 9: Kyle Feldt became the first Blackhawks' player to score 3 tries in a game.
 Round 10: The club recorded their longest winning streak with their 8th straight win.
 Round 25: The club defeated Redcliffe to secure their first minor premiership.
 Finals Week 2: The club defeated the PNG Hunters to qualify for their first grand final.

Squad List
Source:

2015 squad

Fixtures

Pre-season

Regular season

Finals

Statistics

Honours

Club
Player of the Year: Neville Costigan
Players' Player: Jahrome Hughes
Back of the Year: Jahrome Hughes
Forward of the Year: Daniel Beasley

League
Fullback of the Year: Jahrome Hughes
Centre of the Year: Kyle Feldt
Halfback of the Year: Michael Parker-Walshe
Prop of the Year: Daniel Beasley

References

2015 in Australian rugby league
2015 in rugby league by club
Townsville Blackhawks